Million Dollar Mouthpiece is the fourth studio album by rapper Yukmouth, released February 12, 2008 on Rap-A-Lot, Smoke-A-Lot Records, Asylum Records and Warner Bros. Records. Shortly after this release, Yukmouth left Rap-A-Lot Records.

Track listing

Chart positions

References 

2008 albums
Albums produced by Cozmo
Albums produced by Droop-E
Yukmouth albums
Gangsta rap albums by American artists